Amanda-Clearcreek High School is a public high school in Amanda, Ohio.  It is the only high school in the Amanda-Clearcreek Local School District.  The school nickname is the Aces.

Athletics

Ohio High School Athletic Association State Championships
 Boys Football – 1999, 2000

Ohio High School Athletic Association State Runners-Up
 Boys Cross Country - 1980, 1982
 Boys Football - 1997, 2003, 2004

Ohio High School Athletic Association Central District Championships
 Boys Cross Country - 1979, 1980, 1981, 1982, 1991, 1992, 1995, 1997
 Girls Cross Country - 1995, 1996, 1997, 1998

Mid-State League Championships
 Boys Cross Country - 1979, 1980, 1981, 1982, 1983, 1984, 1990, 1991, 1992
 Girls Cross Country - 1991, 1993, 1995, 1997, 1998

Music program
 The high school music program includes choir, jazz band, concert band, marching band, and flag corps. 
 The high school marching band attends several performances yearly including all football games, the Amanda Firefighter's festival parade, the Sweet Corn Festival parade, the Pumpkin Show Parade of Bands, and the Parade of Bands at the Fairfield County Fair. Every four years the band performs in a parade at Walt Disney World in Orlando, Florida.
 The concert and jazz bands and the choir perform in three concerts a year which include their Christmas, winter, and spring concerts. 
 Concert band members and choir members may audition to attend all-county band and choir performances that occur in the winter every year.

Eastland-Fairfield Career & Technical School

External links
 District Website

Notes and references

High schools in Fairfield County, Ohio
Public high schools in Ohio